A window box (sometimes called  a window flower box or window box planter) is a type of flower container for live flowers or plants in the form of a box attached on or just below the sill of a window. It may also be used for growing herbs or other edible plants.

Description 
A window box is usually placed on a window sill, or fixed to the wall immediately below it, so the owner(s) can easily access the plants in it. When installed under a window, it is usually supported by brackets on the wall below. Some materials, such as PVC or fibreglass, use a cleat mounting system from behind to attach it to the building, or it may be bolted directly to the building without the use of support brackets.

Wood, brick, terracotta, metal, fibre glass, vinyl, and cellular PVC may all be used in window box construction. A typical wooden window box lasts 3–5 years before showing deterioration, though with painting and maintenance can last 10–15 years.

Window boxes are usually accessed from indoors, and are often used by people who live on upper floors without access to gardens or other plantable areas. They enable plants to be seen by those inside as well as outside. Larger boxes, 10–12 inches in height, can be used to plant items that need more root space, and to allow flowers and plants to be grown in multiple rows.

Images

See also
 
 Container (flowers)
 Container garden
 Flower box
 Flower pot
 List of gardening topics
 Urban horticulture
 Windowfarm

References

Bibliography

External links 

 Winning Window Boxes

Garden vases
Types of garden
Garden features
Gardening aids
Windows
Urban agriculture